Michele Marchesini (born 30 April 1968) is an Italian sailor. He competed in the Finn event at the 2004 Summer Olympics.

References

External links
 

1968 births
Living people
Italian male sailors (sport)
Olympic sailors of Italy
Sailors at the 2004 Summer Olympics – Finn
Sportspeople from Verona